Verseghya is a genus of lichen-forming fungi in the family Pertusariaceae. It has two species. The genus was circumscribed in 2016 by lichenologists Sergey Kondratyuk, Laszlo Lőkös, and Jae-Seoun Hur, with Verseghya klarae assigned as the type species. This crustose species is found in South Korea, where it grows on the bark of a wide variety of both deciduous and coniferous trees. Molecular phylogenetic analysis showed that Verseghya klarae occupied a separate phylogenetic branch in the Pertusariaceae, situated between the genera Ochrolechia and Pertusaria and the Lecanora subcarnea species complex. Verseghya thysanophora was transferred to the genus (from Lecanora) in 2019. It is widely distributed in the Northern Hemisphere.

Both the genus name and species epithet of the type honour Hungarian lichenologist Klára Verseghy (1930–2020), who, according to the authors, "has made important contributions to our knowledge on species diversity of the genus Ochrolechia".

Nectriopsis verseghyae-klarae is a lichenicolous fungus that parasitises Verseghya klarae.

Species
 Verseghya klarae  – South Korea
 Verseghya thysanophora  – widespread in Northern Hemisphere

References

Pertusariales
Lecanoromycetes genera
Taxa described in 2016
Lichen genera
Taxa named by Sergey Kondratyuk